H.E. Ambassador Sheikh Abdulla bin Mohammed bin Saud Al Thani (Arabic: عبد الله بن محمد بن سعود آل ثاني) is the Qatari Ambassador to Germany, appointed in August 2020. 

He has been a Minister of State and former Chairman of the Board of Directors of Ooredoo Group, a position he has held since 2000. He is a Member of the Supreme Council for Economic Affairs and Investment and is on the Advisory Board of the World Economic Forum Gender Parity Programme.

Career 
Al Thani was instrumental in the restructuring and regional expansion of Ooredoo, steering the growth of Ooredoo from a single-nation telecom operator to a Group with a presence in 10 countries spanning North Africa, Middle East and South East Asia.

During that time he was Chairman of Ooredoo Kuwait and served as President Commissioner of Indosat Ooredoo.

He also served on the ITU Broadband Commission for Digital Development and was a member of the World Bank Group Advisory Council for Gender and Development.

Al Thani was Chief Executive Officer of Qatar Investment Authority, from 2014 to 2018, taking the helm of one of the world’s largest sovereign wealth funds where he played a major role in steering the sovereign wealth fund towards focusing on diversifying its portfolio and increasing its exposure to the United States and Asia.

During his tenure at the Qatar Investment Authority, he also served on the boards of QNB Group, Harrods, and the Sovereign Wealth Fund Institute.

Prior to joining Ooredoo, Al Thani was Chief of the Royal Court (Amiri Diwan of the State of Qatar) and member of the Planning Council from 2000 to 2005. He also was the Founding Chairman of the Board of Trustees for the North Atlantic College in Qatar from 2001 to 2006  and Military Attache to the United Kingdom from 1990 to 2000.

Al Thani is a graduated pilot from the British Army Air Corps as well as a certified pilot instructor by way of the British Royal Air Force. With an extensive background in both the military and aviation, he has previously served Qatar's Emiri Air Force. Al Thani holds a master's degree and has completed a number of programs at various military institutions, among them the United States Army War College. HE, has been awarded the medal of friendship from president Vladimir Putin.

References

External links
 Profile at the World Bank

Living people
Qatari businesspeople
Qatari politicians
Qatari bankers
Central bankers
Abdulla bin Mohammed
Year of birth missing (living people)